Vinäs is a locality situated in Mora Municipality, Dalarna County, Sweden with 329 inhabitants in 2010.

References 

Populated places in Dalarna County
Populated places in Mora Municipality